Mansa Ram (30 May 1940 – 14 January 2023) was an Indian politician and member of the Indian National Congress. Mansa Ram was a member of the Himachal Pradesh Legislative Assembly from the Karsog constituency in Mandi district.

Death
Ram died from kidney failure on 14 January 2023, at the age of 82.

References 

1940 births
2023 deaths
21st-century Indian politicians
People from Mandi district
Indian National Congress politicians
Himachal Vikas Congress politicians
Bharatiya Janata Party politicians from Himachal Pradesh
Himachal Pradesh MLAs 1967–1972
Himachal Pradesh MLAs 1972–1977
Himachal Pradesh MLAs 1982–1985
Himachal Pradesh MLAs 1998–2003
Himachal Pradesh MLAs 2012–2017